Gawk or gawking  may refer to:
gawk (GNU package), the GNU implementation of the AWK programming language
Rubbernecking, openly staring at someone or something, look steadily, gaze.
 Gawk or gock, a type of rimshot in percussion